Jamie Campbell may refer to:
Jamie Campbell (comedian), American comedian
Jamie Campbell (producer) (born 1977), British presenter of ITV's 24 Hours with...
Jamie Campbell (English footballer) (born 1972), English footballer active 1991–2005
Jamie Campbell (Scottish footballer) (born 1992), Scottish footballer for Partick Thistle
Jamie Campbell (rugby union) (born 2001), Scottish rugby union player
Jamie Campbell (sportscaster) (born 1967), Canadian sportscaster
Jamie Campbell, character in Zoo

See also
James Campbell (disambiguation)
Jim Campbell (disambiguation)
Jamie Campbell Bower (born 1988), English actor
Jamie Campbell-Walter (born 1972), British racing driver